The Fat Club is a series of twelve 7-inch singles released monthly by Fat Wreck Chords from March 2001 to February 2002. 1,300 of each single were pressed; They were not available for sale individually, but were distributed by postal service to those who purchased a subscription to the series.

The series featured bands who had not previously been associated with the label: Of the 12 bands who participated, only three—NOFX, Swingin' Utters, and Strung Out—were already part of the Fat Wreck Chords roster. Three of the participating bands had other one-off releases with Fat following their participation in the Fat Club: MxPx's The Renaissance EP (2001), Randy's Randy the Band (2005), and Strike Anywhere's Dead FM (2006). Three of the bands—The Lawrence Arms, The Real McKenzies, and American Steel—became long-term additions to Fat Wreck Chords' roster, releasing multiple albums through the label in the years following. Only The Vandals, Enemy You, and One Man Army have had no further releases through Fat Wreck Chords.

Though the singles were limited, several of the bands re-released their tracks on compilation albums in the years following, including NOFX's 45 or 46 Songs That Weren't Good Enough to Go on Our Other Records (2002), Strike Anywhere's To Live in Discontent (2005), The Lawrence Arms' Cocktails & Dreams (2005), Swingin' Utters' Hatest Grits: B-Sides and Bullshit (2008), and Strung Out's Prototypes and Painkillers (2009). All of the tracks from the series were re-released as part of the Fat Wreck Chords twentieth anniversary compilation Wrecktrospective in 2009.

Summary of releases

Track listings and personnel

The Vandals

 Joe Escalante – bass guitar, backing vocals
 Warren Fitzgerald – guitar, backing vocals
 Josh Freese – drums
 Dave Quackenbush – lead vocals

American Steel

 Scott Healy – drums
 Rory Henderson – lead vocals, guitar
 Ryan Massey – guitar, backing vocals
 John Peck – bass guitar, backing vocals

The Real McKenzies

 Mark Boland – guitar, backing vocals
 Gwomper – bass guitar
 Paul McKenzie – lead vocals
 Kurt Robertson – guitar, backing vocals
 Sean Sellers – drums
 Gord Taylor – Great Highland Bagpipe

MxPx

 Mike Herrera – lead vocals, bass guitar
 Yuri Ruley – drums
 Tom Wisniewski – guitar
 Stephen Egerton – backing vocals on "You Hold the Key"
 Jerry Finn – producer, recording engineer, mix engineer

Strike Anywhere

 Thomas Barnett – lead vocals
 Eric Kane – drums
 Garth Petrie – bass guitar
 Matt Sherwood - guitar, backing vocals
 Matt Smith – guitar, backing vocals

Randy

 Johan Brändström – guitar, backing vocals
 Fredrik Granberg – drums
 Stefan Granberg – lead vocals, guitar
 Johan Gustafsson – bass guitar, backing vocals

NOFX

 El Hefe – lead guitar, backing vocals
 Fat Mike – lead vocals, bass guitar
 Eric Melvin – rhythm guitar, backing vocals
 Erik Sandin – drums

Swingin' Utters

Strung Out

 Chris Aiken – bass guitar
 Jordan Burns – drums
 Jason Cruz – lead vocals
 Jake Kiley – guitar
 Rob Ramos – guitar

Enemy You

 David Jones – lead vocals, guitar
 Chris Matulich – bass guitar
 Joe Yamazaki – drums 
 Ken Yamazaki – guitar

The Lawrence Arms

 Neil Hennessy – drums
 Brendan Kelly – bass guitar, lead and backing vocals
 Chris McCaughan – guitar, lead and backing vocals

One Man Army

References 

Fat Wreck Chords albums